Acriopsis javanica is a species of orchid that is native to Southeast Asia, New Guinea, some Pacific islands and northern Australia. It is a clump-forming epiphyte with dark green leaves and curved, branching flower stems with many white and cream-coloured flowers with purple markings.

Description

Taxonomy and naming
The genus Acriopsis was first formally described in 1825 by Carl Ludwig Blume from an unpublished description by Caspar Georg Carl Reinwardt and Blume's description was published in his book Bijdragen tot de Flora van Nederlandsch Indie. In the same volume, Blume described Acriopsis javanica.

The World Checklist of Selected Plant Families considers A. javanica to be a synonym of A. liliifolia var. liliifolia.

Distribution and habitat
Acriopsis javanica mainly grows in rainforest and coastal swamp forest, sometimes on Melaleuca leucadendron and Pandanus species. It is found from Vietnam to New Guinea, including Singapore, Indonesia and som Pacific Islands and on the Cape York Peninsula in Queensland, as far south as the Daintree River.

References

Orchids of Asia
Epiphytic orchids
Cymbidiinae
Plants described in 1825
Taxa named by Carl Ludwig Blume